Maria von der Osten-Sacken (1901–1985) was a German screenwriter and film producer.

Selected filmography
 A Man with Principles? (1943)
 The Time with You (1948)
 The Disturbed Wedding Night (1950)
 White Shadows (1951)
 Toxi (1952)
 Anna Louise and Anton (1953)
 Stars Over Colombo (1953)
 The Prisoner of the Maharaja (1954)
 Maxie (1954)
 The Silent Angel (1954)
 Rose-Girl Resli (1954)
 Reaching for the Stars (1955)
 The Dark Star (1955)
 Mandolins and Moonlight (1959)
 You Must Be Blonde on Capri (1961)

References

Bibliography
 Fenner, Angelica. Race Under Reconstruction in German Cinema: Robert Stemmle's Toxi. University of Toronto Press, 2011.

External links

1901 births
1985 deaths
German film producers
German women screenwriters
People from Dessau-Roßlau
Film people from Saxony-Anhalt
20th-century German screenwriters